Penny Arcade Adventures: On the Rain-Slick Precipice of Darkness is an episodic action-adventure role-playing video game series based on the webcomic Penny Arcade.

Episode 1 was released on May 21, 2008 on Linux, Mac OS X, Windows, and Xbox Live Arcade, and was later released on PlayStation Network on October 23, 2008. There is a demo available which can be upgraded to the full game. It was later released on Steam, with new Steamworks support. Episode 2 was released on Linux, Mac OS X, Windows, PlayStation Network, and Xbox Live Arcade on October 29, 2008.

The game was originally planned to be distributed episodically across four games.  In March 2010, developer Hothead Games chose to devote its resources instead to DeathSpank, discontinuing its development of further episodes.  Subsequently, prose chapters constituting the plot of Episode 3 were presented on Penny Arcade's website.  In August 2011, Zeboyd Games announced that it would be developing Episode 3 albeit in a completely different graphical style. The third episode was released on June 25, 2012 and subsequently Zeboyd announced that they were working on Episode 4, which was released on June 6, 2013.

Gameplay

Penny Arcade Adventures is a role-playing adventure game which mixes 3D gameplay with 2D interstitials and cinematics. The gameplay consists mostly of seek-and-find puzzles, reminiscent of adventure games, where the player must collect items and return them to a character to advance the plot. They can also collect spare robot parts to upgrade their weapons. Battles consist of a real time combat system similar to the ATB (Active Time Battle) system of Final Fantasy Games, with context sensitive button presses reducing damage or being used to carry out special attacks.

Plot

Episode One
The game begins with the narrator reading the first verse of a poem, later called The Quartet for the Dusk of Man. The player then designs a character of their choosing; with an introduction in the 1920s suburban neighborhood of the Player.  A mysterious voice instructs the Player, whose home is quickly destroyed by a giant robot (a steampunk version of Fruit Fucker Prime), while smaller steampunk Fruit Fuckers attack. After a brief tutorial, the player teams up with Tycho Brahe, a scholar of Apocalyptic Studies turned detective, and his exceedingly violent partner who fought with the devil, Johnathan Gabriel, in search of information on Fruit Fucker Prime.

The three meet with Tycho's mechanically gifted niece, Anne-Claire, who suggests they search New Arcadia for evidence of Fruit Fucker Prime and parts of it. Tycho, Gabe, and the player begin collecting evidence of the giant robot, while also searching for a new home for the player and running afoul of a cult of mimes. They discover the smaller Fruit Fuckers are built in a factory underneath the Shithole, an apartment building the player briefly considers renting from, and that the mimes are devotees of Yog Sethis, also known as the "Silent One". The Necrowombicon, an ancient book that has no text but can be interpreted by a mime, describes the Silent One as "a horrible deity of unending quiet", a giant mime with Cthulhu's head.

Tycho is horrified that he allowed himself to miss the signs of an ancient God's return previously, and despairs that all hope is lost. He then tells the others it's impossible to kill a god, but they can stop it from entering their world. The Silent One is transferring its energy into their world and putting it into a body. If they can destroy its body before the process is complete, the Silent One will go back to the other side. The player asks Anne-Claire for her input, upon which she theories that there might be special items that can endow Tycho, Gabe, and the player's weapons with metaphysical properties capable of harming the Silent One's physical form. They gather the required items (a vacuum tube, scorched hobo urine, and the soul of the mime cult's leader), transform their weapons, and defeat the Silent One.

After the final battle, Tycho, Gabe, and the player watch the Silent One's form explode. Fruit Fucker Prime watches them from the beach, and walks into the ocean after Yog Sethis is destroyed. The second verse of the opening poem is then read aloud by the narrator.

Episode Two
Several months after Episode One ended, the Player has rebuilt his/her house (a tent), and Tycho and Gabe have set out to destroy Fruit Fuckers and try to find a lead on Fruit Fucker Prime. While escaping from a swarm of them, they crash a truck into the Player's (partially rebuilt) house, and recruit him/her to help them track down their lead. A trip to Anne-Claire's reveals that they have found the original designer of the Fruit Fuckers: Dr. Jonathan Crazoir, presently incarcerated in the same sanatorium as Tycho's father and grandfather when they succumbed to the insanity inherent to dealing with otherworldy affairs. She also demands they collect various pieces of equipment for one of her experiments: Five bolts of silk thread, preferably spider silk, a golden bolt, a truck or tractor engine, and a molecule of Energite, a highly unstable element. They enter the sanitarium to find Crazoir, who promises to give Tycho, Gabe, and the Player everything related to his research, as well as a "robot monkey card", if they can free him from the madhouse. After wooing the receptionist, they encounter huntsman/sanatorium owner Dr. Wolfington, who has used the millions made from the Brahe family's inevitable descent into madness to hunt down and kill every rare animal in the world. He declares the Player, Tycho, and Gabe all unfit for society after a rigged inkblot test, and has them injected with various chemicals to induce insanity.

The Player fights off the drugs with the help of Twisp and Catsby, and rescues Tycho and Gabe. A guard catches them, and locks down the facility. This seals off Dr. Wolfington's doors with Strengthium, an unbreakable compound. Anne-Claire donates spare parts to fix the doors, but the power difference between her experimental fuse and the security system unseals all doors in the facility, releasing several giant spiders. The trio harvests them for their silk, as per Anne-Claire's request, collects the engine from the truck that Tycho crashed into the Player's house at the beginning of the game, and return to confront Wolfington. After the fight, they forge release papers for Crazoir and read Wolfington's journal. Crazoir is revealed to have been committed as a favor to the mysterious "M", whose address is written down. The now-free Dr. Crazoir gives over his research, which suggests the Fruit Fucker to originally have been a farming tool called "Harvest Buddy", before the designs were stolen by someone as he was abducted by Dr. Wolfington.

The Player, Tycho, and Gabe travel to the apartment formerly owned by "M", in hopes of renting it. There, they confront Charles DuBois, an old enemy of Tycho and Gabe's and a ruthless treasure hunter. He plans to outright purchase the apartment out as his "Mid-late-Fall home" (or "early Spring home"; he hadn't decided), and Tycho insists that the Player must thwart him. A chase to the apartment ends in the landlord deciding he will give the apartment to whoever wins in a one-on-one fight to the death. Gabe goes to the kitchen to make a pie, and Tycho ransacks "M"'s apartment, finding various demonic items, including the Black Ledger, a tome that catalogs every deal made between demons and mortals. He pockets the Ledger, and returns to the Player, who has easily won the "sissy boss fight". Gabe finishes his pie, and accidentally sets the building on fire; leaving the player homeless yet again.

Anne-Claire directs the trio next to the "Symposium on the Future of Man" to find more information on Fruit Fucker Prime (as well as the autograph of her idol, Dr. Lars Krangle). They gain credentials with the other scientists by winning a robot monkey fighting tournament, the first-place trophy of which happens to be a molecule of Energite. Unfortunately, at the end of Dr. Krangle's  keynote speech, Fruit Fucker Prime attacks, killing everyone in attendance, save Tycho, Gabe, the Player, and the enigmatic Dr. Blood, distinguished by his "timely appearance in the narrative". The robot is revealed to be piloted by Dr. Mordo von Mundo, also known as "M". Dr. Blood hastily explains that the Fruit Fuckers run on Darksteam, a steam mechanism that is infused with pure evil. Mundo then admits creations are stolen designs, and he himself is ostracized from the scientific community because of his radical theories on combining science and arcane magic. He intends to prove his abilities through manipulation of Fruit Fucker Prime, which is powered by the Necrowombicon itself, while the smaller units are powered by inscriptions from the book. After Mordo leaves to enact his scheme, Dr. Blood reveals to the Player and Gabe that Fruit Fucker Prime is the avatar of yet another god: Yog Kathak, the God of Gears, which Tycho was aware of, but hid from the other two. The four unite regardless, and leave for the 1922 World's Fair to stop Mordo von Mundo once and for all.

Anne-Claire is mysteriously no longer in her room, and at the fair, Fruit Fucker Prime is occupied, violating a building-sized orange against Mundo's will. After fighting through demon-possessed fairgoers, the team reaches the orange, where they do battle with Fruit Fucker Prime. They succeed in destroying its "chute", but the god's essence within heals all damage rendered to its main components. As the four prepare for their deaths, Anne-Claire arrives piloting a giant robot of her own; a massive doll powered by a truck engine and Energite, wearing a Spider-Silk dress. Anne-Claire destroys Prime, Tycho and Gabe kill Mundo, and the Player retrieves the Necrowombicon. The narrator reads the third verse of the Quartet for the Dusk of Man.

After the credits, it is revealed that Dr. Blood is in fact, Dr. Raven Darktalon Blood, who took mortal form to seek out and destroy the Necrowombicon.

Episode 3
Episode 3 was released almost 4 years after Episode 2 on June 25, 2012. Unlike the first 2 episodes it will also be available on Android OS and iOS devices in addition to Xbox Live Arcade, PC, and Mac. Also unlike the previous episodes it is not available for Linux or PS3.

Episode 3 features a completely different art style which is similar to the pixel graphics of the SNES era. Combat is similar to the early Final Fantasy games with heroes being positioned on the right side of the screen and the monsters on the left side of the screen. Unlike the first two entries in the series Episode 3 does not feature any voice work and the player no longer plays as the player-created character from the first two episodes. The title also received two free packs of downloadable content after release: The Lair of the Seamstress, which added a bonus dungeon to the game that became unlocked after getting all the class pins up to level 40, and The Beginning of the End, which reveals the fate of the player character between the events of Episodes 2 and 3.

The Beginning of the End
The prelude begins with a small explanation on what terrifies Gabe: dentists, witches, a coven of witch-dentists, a fight with a massive sorcerer made up of other sorcerers. Tycho chimes in that he's been thinking about how "antiquated" the English language is, the pronouns in particular. He then proclaims to quit English pronouns cold turkey and start using "ze, hir, and hirs" from that point on. A skeptical Gabriel then goes back to sleep, only to be awakened by Tycho five seconds later and given a mysterious black substance to drink. After Gabe drinks it, the floor starts shaking and the pair suddenly remember something that Tycho keeps in their basement, prompting them to leave. Upon leaving the office, Gabe asks where they're going, to which Tycho replies Desperation Street. Turning the corner at the end of their block, they find a large pile of inventions called "Duplicators" and their inventor, who was unfortunately crushed to death by said pile after somehow making the Duplicator duplicate itself.

The pair quickly journey to Desperation Street, with Gabe asking why they are there. Tycho gives two answers: one, a mysterious hunch, and two, to visit the "Rake Guy" (a.k.a. the player, who will be referred to as "You"). When Gabe notices the large burlap sack Tycho is carrying, Tycho weakly plays it off that he likes burlap sacks. Making their way to the ruins of the player's house, they find You huddled in the threshold asleep, wearing a large hat and a trench coat. Although Tycho still sees You as he always has: a vibrating being, a superimposed cluster of possibilities. Just as Gabe starts to say hello, Tycho quickly jumps You, stuffing them into the burlap sack he was carrying. The trio enter the fallen house, where Tycho and Gabe find out why it was in ruins again, as a sinkhole formed underneath the house and its filled with squatters. Fighting their way through the house, they find the opened sewer system that caused the sinkhole and within it, the cause of all the bad luck that has befallen both Desperation Street and the house. The sewer system below Desperation Street was littered with crystalline physical manifestations of literal bad luck, with Your house at the epicenter of it all. As they make their way further into the sewer, they happen upon a kismetite golem, made entirely of good luck, whose torso Tycho fails to diplomatically obtain. After destroying the golem, a frustrated Tycho leads Gabe and You further in, finding a massive kismetite crystal in the back of the room, with a portal right next to it. Dispatching of the crystal's guardian, Tycho and Gabe heft the crystal through the portal into the Periphery.

With crystal in tow, the trio make their way through the Periphery, wandering its stone pathways until they find reach some far off corner within the Never. As Tycho sets the crystal into place, another being shows up from out of nowhere. A hulking version of Tycho, with glowing red eyes, a manifestation of Tycho's guilt, the Brahirim, who questions whether he knows better than his ancestors and proclaims that Tycho will find no comfort in his "philosophy". Tycho asks who will continue the Brahe Clan's work, knowing that the Brahirim wouldn't harm him. The Brahirim answers with a vague "You know how. You know.", to which Tycho does indeed know the answer. After defeating the Brahirim, Tycho takes out a tuning fork and taps it against the crystal, the tone causing it to turn into a jelly. As You begins to get away, Tycho orders Gabe to put You and the kismetite into the crystal. After the Rake Guy is put into the crystal, Tycho says that nobody must know of the events that just happened. Despite Gabe saying he isn't going to tell anyone, Tycho knows that he will fail to keep his promise, and word-of-mouth will spread between those who won't believe him to someone who can potentially use it against him. Tycho then pulls out his trump card to keep Gabe from telling anyone: calling upon the spirit of Lucifer within Gabe's body to forget the day's events. Afterwards, Gabriel slumps to the ground and Tycho puts him over his shoulder, returning home for the day.

Episode Three
The main game begins with Tycho receiving a phone call which is described as 10 minutes of silence, prompting Tycho and Gabe to go to the Arcadia boardwalk where they had previously defeated the mime god and members of his cult. Teaming up with Anne-Claire, they fight past the cultists, and eventually face off against a crabomancer, then, upon defeating it, recover pins which bestow classes on whoever wears one (similar to the job system in early Final Fantasy games). They return to their office, only to find that Dr. Blood has orchestrated the theft of the Necrowombicon. Anne-Claire returns home, Tycho and Gabe team up with Jim, a former colleague who lost his body in a work-related incident, reducing him to a skull floating in a jar of green liquid. Jim is unable to speak, but can follow Tycho and Gabe, as well as participate in combat. Following leads, they arrive at the museum of contemporary and ancient works, where Tycho is reunited with Moira, his ex-wife, who joins the party. When asked if they can re-recruit Anne-Claire, Tycho answers she is on vacation with her parents. The party discovers that a painting has been stolen from the museum, the painting being one of four representing the god of doors, Yog-Modaign, a death-god like figure.

Now also investigating the theft of the painting, the party, acting on advice of Dr. Euripides Hark, head for the Hark ancestral home. However, as the Harks are an old family and possess superior arcane know-how to Tycho, Tycho forces the party to use an alternate entrance, a trans-dimensional door accessible only via another dimension. The party returns to the detective agency to pick up a device capable of allowing them to enter this dimension, but it is revealed that, in his ignorance of what the object was (it resembles a stein), Gabe gave it to a local homeless man. The party goes to Hobo alley to recover it, and then head into the other dimension called the Periphery, represented by a stone path leading to multiple gateways, dotted with floating crystals. Tycho explains that the crystals are in fact, coffins, or time capsules, usually containing powerful mages or mythical creatures. Since the other dimension would survive any apocalypse, the contents of the crystal time capsules would inevitably be used to determine the properties of the world to come after the end of ours. The Brahe clan's long project, which Tycho and his family frequently speak of, is to wipe out these time capsules, as everyone would "get it wrong" and recreate the universe poorly.

Exiting in the Hark mansion, they find more class pins, and are trapped in a temporal shift, leaving Gabe and Jim trapped in the past. However, without anyone to tell him otherwise, Gabe smashes through the house, leaving open paths for Tycho and Moira, and indicating where they could eventually be found. At the end of the Hark house, they encounter Elizabeth Hark, head of a society worshiping mankind, who are trying to stop the revival of Yog-Modaign. She warns Tycho that even if the god is let loose, not to kill it, as having banished (or killed) two gods earlier, he is in danger of creating a power vacuum which a surviving god-entity could exploit to disastrous effect. At the end of their conversation, Dr. Blood appears again and steals another piece of the Yog-Modaign painting from the Harks.

In anticipation of Dr. Blood's next move, they go to intercept him at the Bank of Money. Unfortunately, they find that some of the vaults lead to other dimensions, including one similar to a medieval fantasy, and one resembling a starship from Star Trek. This slows them down considerably. They finally discover that the last painting is still in the hands of the Harks and that the four paintings are a prison of sorts for Yog-Modaign, as gods cannot be bound in cages, but can be bound in perfect representations, hence the painting so accurately represents the god, that it is the god, and when it is disassembled, so is the god. Before they can move to recover it, Tycho is alerted to some disaster by an amulet he is holding, and he forces the party to head to the Periphery. While there, they discover that Tycho has placed Anne-Claire in one of the crystal time capsules, in the belief that she would be an ideal candidate to remake the world after the upcoming apocalypse. Moira attempts to free her niece but they are interrupted by Yog-Modaign, whose avatar appeared near Anne-Claire specifically to lure Tycho to the periphery and buy Dr. Blood more time to assemble his painting. They defeat him only because he is unable to muster his full power.

The party finally heads to the Hark stronghold, which is full of cultists. They fight their way to the bottom where they defeat Elizabeth Hark and then Dr. Blood. After the last boss battle, Yog-Modaign makes a final appearance and tears Tycho apart, creating some kind of tear in the universe. Gabe and a weakened Dr. Blood are sent hurtling through empty space, while Gabe punches Dr. Blood repeatedly. Moira and Jim are sent to someplace resembling hell; while there, Jim appears as a humanoid made of green goo with his skull for a head. Jim is also able to speak and appears to know their location. Tycho is seen wearing a brown robe in a dark place where he recites the last verse of the poem by his dead father.

Episode 4

The fourth episode begins with Gabe and Dr. Blood crashing down onto a hellscape. Without other options, Gabe is forced to pair with Dr. Blood, who gleefully explains that when they defeated Yog Modaign, the apocalypse happened and the world was destroyed. Those closest to the epicenter were tossed into a dimension called Underhell, so-called because it resembles a massive floating continent, directly below the massive floating continent of Hell. Gabe reasons that Jim, Moira and Tycho must have been sent to Underhell as well and bargains with Dr. Blood to aid him in searching for them. Dr. Blood reveals his motivations: in his youth, he traded the soul of his lover Hestia for knowledge. He since had come to regret his actions, and engineered a premature apocalypse in order to send himself to Underhell, where he hoped to reunite with Hestia. Dr. Blood also informs Gabe that since they are not of the same make-up as Underhell, they cannot harm its inhabitants, meaning they must use Underhell monsters to fight for them (similar to Pokémon). They head towards a large pillar structure where Dr. Blood believes he will find Hestia.

Meanwhile, Moira and Jim have a similar conversation where Jim informs Moira they must use proxies to fight. Jim informs Moira that the Apocalypse failed to end all creation because there remains a single God maintaining Hell and Underhell.  They fight their way through a castle filled with clones of Tycho (revealed to be his damned family) until they encounter the real Tycho, who can attack Underhell denizens with a magical sword he acquired. Tycho reveals that the structure of Hell and Underhell is such that Hell is held over Underhell by three massive pillars, and that if these are brought down, the resulting collapse would kill or at least reveal the location of the remaining God. He sends Moira and Jim to the first pillar, while he heads to the second.

At the first pillar, Gabe and Dr. Blood ascend and find that Hestia is present and seemingly the hostage of the Pillar boss. They defeat him, which causes the pillar to destabilize. Hestia accuses Dr. Blood of only making her life worse and reveals that she was in fact controlling the Pillar boss and his minions; she then kills Dr. Blood as the pillar collapses. Jim and Moira arrive in time to see the pillar fall and find Gabe and Hestia in the wreckage. Moira sends Gabe (now paired with Hestia) to the second pillar to meet Tycho, while they head to the last pillar.

At the second pillar, modeled after the tree Yggdrasil, Gabe and Hestia discover that a zoo had been built in the branches and that all the animals had escaped. They fight their way to the top, along the way freeing a flying demon whale. At the top, they team up with Tycho to kill the second pillar boss, a chimera composed of six animals. They defeat the pillar boss, causing the pillar to collapse. Tycho escapes by teleporting away, while Gabe and Hestia are rescued by the demon whale they released earlier.

At the third pillar, Moira and Jim find more of the damned Brahe family locked in combat with a group of technologically advanced librarians. The Brahes are trying to bring down the pillar while the librarians wish to safeguard it. Moira learns that Tycho is somewhat different from the rest of his family, in that he let Moira go, a first for a Brahe, which possibly saved her from their family curse. They assault the pillar and meet Tycho at the top, where they defeat the last pillar boss and bring down the pillar. This however, fails to destroy Hell or Underhell, and it is revealed that the Hell continent above Underhell is in fact the body of the last God, capable of remaining afloat on its own. Furthermore, the last God is revealed to be the series narrator, and the one who put the Brahes on the path to destroy the universe. It did this as it was completely omniscient and this drove it to madness. Tycho teleports again, leaving Moira and Jim behind.

Gabe and Hestia arrive on their demon whale, and the party, combined for the first time, flies to Hell/the body of the last God. There they fight their way through its body, destroying its Spleen and Heart before joining Tycho to kill its Brain. This however, is not enough and the last shred of the God's mind possesses Tycho. Gabe, Hestia, Moira and Jim defeat the God possessing Tycho, though Tycho still asks that he be killed so as to destroy the God for good and end creation. However, before he requests this, he summons the spirit of Lucifer inside of Gabe and commands it to merge with Gabe himself. Tycho tells Gabe that he is the Lightbringer named Lucifer, created to assist the Brahes in the Long Project. Gabe comes to terms with this and forgives his friend. Tycho says what remaining goodbyes can be given under the circumstances before Moira shoots him in the head.

In the epilogue, Tycho's niece, who he hid in a pocket dimension, wakes up and begins to create a new universe, thanking her Uncle for his sacrifice and saying she and "You" will take over. Two constellations appear in space: one of a wrench and one of a rake.

Development
Penny Arcade Adventures was officially announced on August 25, 2006. Robert Khoo, director of business relations at Penny Arcade, stated that the Penny Arcade team decided to partner with Hothead Games because they felt the developer would produce content that would remain faithful to the feel of Penny Arcade. Khoo also stressed that Penny Arcade's creators would be involved in the development, from providing art to writing the story. The in-game music was composed by Jeff Tymoschuk, with the song "Final Boss" by MC Frontalot playing over the closing credits of Episode One. Episode Two's ending song is "Some Things Man Was Not Meant to Know", by The Darkest of the Hillside Thickets. Charles's indecision regarding when he would live in his apartment refers to similar indecision on Holkins's part about whether to introduce Charles in Episode Two (released mid-late Fall 2008) or Episode Three, which was expected to release in early spring 2009 at the time.

During a Q&A session at PAX East 2010 on March 26, Holkins and Krahulik admitted that plans for production of Episode Three had been canceled, and that the ending of the story might be released in written form instead. On December 21, 2009 Wired.com named Episode 3 number seven in their list of top ten Vaporware 2009. In August 2011, Zeboyd Games announced that it would be developing Episode 3 albeit in a 16-bit graphical style. At PAX East 2012, the developers from Zeboyd Games confirmed the Player wouldn't be appearing in Episode 3. The third episode was released on June 25, 2012 and Episode 4 was officially revealed on January 24, 2013, with it being released on June 7, 2013.

Reception

Episode 1 

Episode 1 has been modestly praised by reviewers. On the aggregate review sites GameRankings and Metacritic, Penny Arcade Adventures garnered critic averages from 76 to 79%. Penny Arcade released statistics showing that their game ranked third best in launch sales on Xbox Live Marketplace, coming after Rez HD and Ikaruga.

While the game's artistic style and humor have drawn approval (with Edge noting that the latter can be an acquired taste), critics have questioned whether the gameplay will be strong enough to drive a whole series of titles.

Episode 2 

Episode 2 received similar reviews to the reviews of Episode 1, yet generated only one third of its sales.

Episode 3

References

External links 

 Precipice of Darkness Game Website
 Hothead Games website
 Episode 3 text website

2008 video games
Adventure games
Episodic video games
Linux games
MacOS games
Indie video games
Penny Arcade (webcomic)
Role-playing video games
Video games based on webcomics
Video games developed in Canada
Video games developed in the United States
Video games scored by Jeff Tymoschuk
Video games set in psychiatric hospitals
Windows games
Xbox 360 Live Arcade games
PlayStation Network games
Torque (game engine) games
Steampunk video games
Hothead Games games
Single-player video games
Video games about cults